Draw It!  is a drawing game show that aired on Channel 4 from 5 May to 4 July 2014, hosted by Mel Giedroyc. It is loosely based on the popular mobile app, Draw Something.

Format
Each week, two well-known celebrities pair up with a different daily contestant in the studio in order to help them win a cash prize. The two contestants who have the highest scores across the week and top the leaderboard come back to play on 'Big Money Friday' where contestants have the chance to walk away with up to £50,000. The aim is to guess the exact word that is being drawn. Contestants can activate the word jumble, to show them an anagram of the word, by pressing a buzzer, but this halves the money they get if they give a correct answer. On 'Big Money Friday' correct answers in the first 3 rounds are worth double.

Celebrities

Notable contestants
Nick Smith won £41,000 on 23 May 2014, partnered with Louie Spence.

References

External links
 
 

2010s British game shows
2014 British television series debuts
2014 British television series endings
Channel 4 game shows
English-language television shows
Television series by Sony Pictures Television